J. B. Tularam was a Fiji Indian member of the Legislative Council of Fiji elected from the Eastern Constituency in 1937 by defeating Channa Bhai Patel by 14 votes. The constituency was made up of the provinces of Lomaiviti, Lau, Cakaudrove and Macuata. He was a member of the Council until 1944.

He had three sons and four daughters, late Pandit Brahmdeo Tularam; late Pandit Brahm Anand Tularam [Brisbane], late Vijay Datt Tularam, Shushilawati, Kamlawati, Late Satywati, and Subhagwati (former President (first female) of the Fiji teachers union - Suva branch) ; and two grandsons, Pandit Dr Gurudeo Anand Tularam [Senior Lecturer in Mathematics, Griffith University, Brisbane] and Pandit Videshwar Tularam [NZ]; and two great grandsons; Divyadeo [Rohit] Tularam {Brisbane} and Barun Tularam {NZ};

References

Fijian Hindus
Indian members of the Legislative Council of Fiji